The LNB All-Star Game is the annual All-Star Game that is organised by France's professional club basketball governing body, the LNB. The LNB organizes both of the top two French men's pro club competitions, the top-level LNB Pro A, and the second-level LNB Pro B. The event was first held in 1987, and is loosely based on the NBA All-Star Game.

History
From 1987 through 1991, the LNB All-Star Game was played under a "East" versus "West" format. Since 1992, the game is played under a French players versus foreign players (non-French players) format.

LNB All-Star games

Slam Dunk Contest winners

All-Star Game Rosters 1987–2019

80s
1st All-Star Game 1986–87
Palais de Sports de Bea,ublanc, Limoges, att: 5000, May 6, 1987: West - East 134–128  
EAST (George Fisher): Pierre Bressant 11, Billy Joe Williams 14, Robert Smith 24, Bill Varner 23, Jean-Aimé Toupane 6, Jean-Louis Hersin, Christian Garnier 2, Lionel Rigo 2, Jean-Luc Deganis 15, Frédéric Monetti 6, Éric Beugnot 11, Mick Pitts 12.
WEST (Michel Gomez): Freddy Hufnagel 6, Valéry Demory 12, Patrick Cham 11, Richard Dacoury 20, Howard Carter 24, Jacques Monclar 4, Paul Thompson, Hervé Dubuisson 13, Benkali Kaba 2, Tom Scheffler 8, Georges Vestris 6, Stéphane Ostrowski 15, Clarence Kea 13.

2nd All-Star Game 1987–88
Mulhouse Sports Palace, att: 4,000, May 20, 1988: West - East 164–136  
EAST: Pierre Bressant, Hervé Dubuisson, James Hardy, Skeeter Jackson, Robert Smith, Jean-Aimé Toupane, Ron Davis, Christian Monschau, Vincent Collet, Damien Pastrès, Christophe Soulé.
WEST: Gregor Beugnot, Jacques Monclar, Hugues Occansey, Stéphane Ostrowski, Don Collins, Georges Vestris, Graylin Warner, Didier Gadou, Andrew Fields, Franck Butter.

3d All-Star Game 1988–89
La Meilleraie, Cholet, May 12, 1989: West - East 146–141  
EAST (Francis Charneux): Pierre Bressant, Robert Smith 20, Jacques Monclar, Billy Joe Williams, Éric Occansey, Pat Burtey, Georgy Adams, Ron Davis 24, Philip Szanyiel, Hervé Dubuisson, Rick Raivio 22, Franck Butter and Benkali Kaba, Apollo Faye, Willie Redden.
WEST (Jean Galle): Gregor Beugnot, Bruno Lejeune, Valéry Demory, Richard Dacoury, Freddy Hufnagel, Stéphane Ostrowski 33, Graylin Warner 29, Don Collins, Michael Brooks 34, Georges Vestris, Jean-Luc Deganis, Stéphane Lauvergne and Andrew Fields, Didier Gadou, Christophe Soulé.

4th All-Star Game 1989–90
Palais des Sports Jean-Weille, Nancy, att: 4,000, June 1, 1990: East - West 170–146  
EAST: Jean-Aimé Toupane, Ron Davis 24, Franck Butter, Philip Szanyiel, Robert Smith, Georgi Adams, Lee Johnson 26, Hugues Occansey 24, Eric Occansey 8, Greg Beugnot.
WEST: Michael Brooks 40, Ken Dancy, Stéphane Ostrowski, Richard Dacoury, Valéry Demory, Jim Bilba, Antoine Rigaudeau, Freddy Hufnagel.

90s

8th All-Star Game 1993–94
Palais des Sports, Tours, att: 4,000, March 6, 1994: Foreign Stars - French Stars 110–108  
FOREIGN STARS (Laurent Buffard, Jacques Monclar): Don Collins, Skeeter Henry 24, Bill Jones, George Montgomery, David Rivers, Delaney Rudd, José Vargas, Michael Young, Marcus Webb.
FRENCH STARS (Božidar Maljković, Jean-Luc Monschau): Jim Bilba, Yann Bonato, Richard Dacoury, Hervé Dubuisson 30, Frédéric Forte, Marc M'Bahia, Stéphane Ostrowski, Antoine Rigaudeau, Moustapha Sonko

9th All-Star Game 1994–95
Palais des Sports de Pau, Pau, att: 8,000, March 9, 1995: Foreign Stars - French Stars 147–137  
FOREIGN STARS: David Rivers 22, Delaney Rudd, Michael Young, Ron Curry 24, Michael Ray Richardson 24, Ron Anderson, Conrad McRae, Rickie Winslow, Ian Lockhart, Tim Kempton.
FRENCH STARS: Jim Bilba, Yann Bonato 44, Richard Dacoury 20, Frédéric Forte, Stéphane Ostrowski 21, Antoine Rigaudeau, Thierry Gadou, Laurent Foirest, Bruno Coqueran, Moustapha Sonko, Stéphane Risacher.

11th All-Star Game 1996–97
Pierre-de-Coubertin Sports Palace, Montpellier, att: 5,000, March 29, 1997: Foreign Stars - French Stars 115–109  
FOREIGN STARS (Bogdan Tanjevic): Delaney Rudd, Skeeter Henry, David Booth, Paul Fortier, Brad Sellers, James Blackwell, Ron Anderson, Michael Ray Richardson, Steve Payne, Josh Grant.
FRENCH STARS (Jacques Monclar: Moustapha Sonko, Yann Bonato, Alain Digbeu, Jim Bilba, Frédéric Weis, Frédéric Forte, Georgy Adams, Stéphane Risacher, Cyril Julian, Stéphane Ostrowski.

12th All-Star Game 1997–98
Palais des Sports de Dijon, att: 4,000, April 25, 1998: French Stars - Foreign Stars 170–146  
FOREIGN STARS: Keith Hill 16, Nenad Marković 16, Jerry McCullough 14, Delaney Rudd 11, Nikola Lončar 9, Paul Graham 8, Josh Grant 8, Jean-Jacques Conceição 6, Eric Struelens 6, Derek Durham 4.
FRENCH STARS: Alain Digbeu 27, Stéphane Risacher 20, Moustapha Sonko 18, Paul Fortier 14, Jim Bilba 9, Bruno Hamm 8, Derrick Lewis 7, Laurent Foirest 6, Thierry Gadou 3, Frédéric Weis.

13th All-Star Game 1998–99
Coubertin, Paris, January 2, 1999: Foreign Stars - French Stars 124–122  
FOREIGN STARS: Delaney Rudd 14, Nenad Marković  14, Juan Aisa 2, Keith Jennings 10, Jerome Robinson 7, Ron Anderson 21, Keith Hill 21, Josh Grant 19, Darius Hall 13, Gary Alexander 3.
FRENCH STARS: Moustapha Sonko 26, Laurent Sciarra 9, Laurent Foirest 12, Alain Digbeu 19, Christophe Dumas 8, Crawford Palmer 10, Cyril Julian 8, Georgy Adams 9, Jim Bilba 17, Frédéric Weis 4.

14th All-Star Game 1999–00
Nancy, January 2, 2000: Foreign Stars - French Stars 103–93  
FOREIGN STARS: Marlon Maxey 21, Ray Minlend 19, Jay Larranaga 13, Dante Calabria 13, Stanley Jackson 10, Derek Durham 9, Steve Payne 5, Keith Gatlin 5, Gary Alexander 6, Harper Williams 2.
FRENCH STARS: Thierry Gadou 15, Stéphane Risacher 14, Laurent Sciarra 12, Moustapha Sonko 10, Jim Bilba 10, Yann Bonato 8, Frédéric N'Kembe 7, Makan Dioumassi 6, Cyril Julian 6, Frédéric Weis 5.

2000s

15th All-Star Game 2000–01
Azur Arena, Antibes, December 29, 2000: French Stars - Foreign Stars 123–117  
FRENCH STARS (Gregor Beugnot, Jean-Louis Borg): : Laurent Sciarra, Mickaël Piétrus, David Gautier, Jim Bilba, Cyril Julian, Tony Parker, Yann Mollinari, Laurent Bernard, Laurent Pluvy, Willem Laure, David Frigout, and Fabien Dubos.
FOREIGN STARS (Vincent Collet, Didier Dobbels): Shawnta Rogers, Roger Esteller, Zakhar Pashutin, Art Long, Gary Alexander, Stevin Smith, Curtis McCants, Chris King, Skeeter Henry, Andre Riddick and Geof Lear.

16th All-Star Game 2001–02
Le Colisée, Chalon-sur-Saone, December 28, 2001: Foreign Stars - French Stars 104–97  
FRENCH STARS (Claude Bergeaud): Laurent Pluvy, Yann Mollinari, Florent Piétrus, Yann Bonato, Mickaël Piétrus, David Gautier, Fabien Dubos, Boris Diaw, Cyril Julian, Sacha Giffa.
FOREIGN STARS (Jean-Luc Monschau): Nikola Radulovic, Brian Howard, Nikola Vujcic, Danny Strong, Marc Brown, Roger Esteller, Andre Riddick, Robert Gulyas, Larry Terry.

17th All-Star Game 2002–03
Paris-Bercy, Paris, December 28, 2002: Foreign Stars - French Stars 131–118  
FRENCH STARS (Philippe Hervé, Ruddy Nelhomme): Laurent Bernard, Babacar Cisse, Mickaël Piétrus, Laurent Sciarra, Yann Bonato, Makan Dioumassi, Vincent Masingue, Florent Piétrus, Jim Bilba, David Gautier, Vasco Evtimov, Cyril Julian.
FOREIGN STARS (Jean-Luc Monschau, Michel Veyronnet): Keith Jennings, Shawnta Rogers, Dragan Lukovski, Scooter Barry, Danny Strong, Jermaine Guice, Ricardo Greer, Rico Hill, K'zell Wesson, Rahshon Turner, Robert Gulyas, Rod Sellers.

18th All-Star Game 2003–04
Paris-Bercy, Paris, December 28, 2003: French Stars - Foreign Stars 126–113  
FRENCH STARS (Vincent Collet: Paccelis Morlende, Stéphane Dondon, Laurent Foirest 27, Vincent Masingue, Cyril Julian 20, Laurent Sciarra, Babacar Cisse, Frédéric N’Kembe, Mickaël Gelabale, Thierry Rupert, Claude Marquis, Thierry Gadou.
FOREIGN STARS (Frédéric Sarre): Randolph Childress, Jermaine Guice, Danny Strong 20, Rahshon Turner, Sandro Nicević, Jason Rowe*, Dragan Lukovski, Hollis Price 18, Rowan Barrett 14, Vakhtang Natsvlishvili, Rick Hughes, T.J. Lux*Jason Rowe replaced injured Shawnta Rogers.

19th All-Star Game 2004–05
Paris-Bercy, Paris, att: 14,700, December 29, 2004: French Stars - Foreign Stars 105–94  
FRENCH STARS (Erman Kunter): Laurent Sciarra 11, Pape-Philippe Amagou, Mickael Mokongo 12, Mamoutou Diarra, Yannick Bokolo, Laurent Foirest 24, Amara Sy 26, Luc-Arthur Vebobe 11, Maxime Zianveni, Cyril Akpomedah, Claude Marquis, Alain Koffi.
FOREIGN STARS (Eric Girard): Marques Green, Hollis Price, Terrell Lyday, Jermaine Guice, Thabo Sefolosha 17, Tariq Kirksay, Boniface Ndong, K'Zell Wesson, Sharif Fajardo, Hüseyin Beşok, Clint Cotis Harrison*, Rahshon Turner 24.*Clint Cotis Harrison was injured

20th All-Star Game 2005–06
Paris-Bercy, Paris, December 18, 2005: French Stars - Foreign Stars 96–85  
FRENCH STARS (Didier Gadoum John Douaglin): Yohann Sangare, Amara Sy, Pape-Philippe Amagou 12, Babacar Cisse, Mamoutou Diarra, Yakhouba Diawara, Maxime Zianveni 13, Claude Marquis 12, Thomas Dubiez, Victor Samnick, Cyril Julian. Ian Mahinmi.
FOREIGN STARS (Claude Bergeaud, German Castano): K'zell Wesson 19, Jimmy Baxter, Loonie Cooper, Ricardo Greer, John Linehan, Mike Bauer, Jason Rowe 12, Tyson Wheeler, Hüseyin Beşok, Kelvin Torbert, Mario Bennett, Lamayn Wilson.

21st All-Star Game 2006–07
Paris-Bercy, Paris, December 18, 2006: Foreign Stars - French Stars 124–108  
FRENCH STARS (Jean-Luc Monschau, Franck Le Goff): Ahmed Fellah 4, Ali Traore 24, Cyril Julian 21, Mamoutou Diarra 17, Yannick Bokolo 4, Maxime Zianveni, Marc-Antoine Pellin, Georgi Joseph, Tariq Kirksay 7, Laurent Sciarra 9, Pape Badiane 10, Yohann Sangare 11.
FOREIGN STARS (Grégor Beugnot, Jean-Louis Borg): Cedrick Banks 12, Kenny Gregory 14, Aaron Harper 5, Ricardo Greer 6, Terrell Everett 10, Dewarick Spencer 19, Jermaine Guice 9, Eric Campbell 12, Mario Bennett, Marc Salyers 20, Terence Dials 10, Michael Wright 7.

22nd All-Star Game 2007–08
Paris-Bercy, Paris, att: 14,828, December 29, 2007: French Stars - Foreign Stars 94–82  
FRENCH STARS (Yves Baratet, Ruddy Nelhomme: Nicolas Batum, Dounia Issa, Alain Koffi, Steed Tchicamboud, Pape Badiane, Marc-Antoine Pellin, Nando de Colo 13, Victor Samnick, Cyril Julian 16, Laurent Foirest, Vincent Masingue, Cyril Akpomedah, Yohann Sangare 15.
FOREIGN STARS (Jean-Luc Monschau, Michel Veyronnet: John Cox, Jimmal Ball, Sean Colson, Lamayn Wilson, Chevon Troutman 18, Jeff Greer, Brion Rush 8, Uche Nsonwu-Amadi, Tony Williams, Sam Clancy Jr., Ricardo Greer 20, Marc Salyers.

23rd All-Star Game 2008–09
Paris-Bercy, Paris, att: 14,658, December 28, 2008: Foreign Stars - French Stars 108–101  

FRENCH STARS (Philippe Hervé, Didier Dobbels): Amara Sy 17, Abdoulaye M'Baye, Laurent Foirest, Alain Koffi, Yannick Bokolo, Stéphane Risacher, Nando de Colo 15, Ali Traoré, Victor Samnick, Laurent Sciarra 25. On hold: Marc-Antoine Pellin, Cheikhou Thioune.
FOREIGN STARS (Vincent Collet, Jean-Marc Dupraz): Cedrick Banks, Lamayn Wilson 23, Zack Wright 18, Kevin Houston, Brion Rush, Damir Krupalija, Tony Skinn, Eric Campbell 15, Austin Nichols, Chevon Troutman. On hold: Hrvoje Perincic, Rashaun Freeman.

24th All-Star Game 2009–10
Paris-Bercy, Paris, December 30, 2009: French Stars - Foreign Stars 89–88  
FOREIGN STARS (Erman Kunter, Éric Girard: John Linehan, Derrick Obasohan, Ricardo Greer, Uche Nsonwu-Amadi, Dewarick Spencer, Ben Woodside, Cedrick Banks, Angel Daniel Vassallo, Sean Marshall, Mouhamed Sene. Reserves: Kareem Reid, Akinlolu Akingbala.
FRENCH STARS (JD Jackson, Didier Dobbels: Steed Tchicamboud, Antoine Diot, Cyril Akpomedah, Dounia Issa, Ali Traore, Edwin Jackson, Fabien Causeur, David Melody, Mickael Gelabale, Pape Badiane. Reserves: Abdoulaye MBaye, Pierre-Yves Guillard.

2010s

25th All-Star Game 2010–11
Paris-Bercy, Paris, att: 14,700, December 30, 2010: Foreign Stars - French Stars 103–90  
FRENCH STARS (Jean-Luc Monschau): Yannick Bokolo, Pape-Philippe Amagou 13, Mickael Gelabale 20, Cyril Akpomedah, Alain Koffi, Andrew Albicy, Steed Tchicamboud, Antoine Mendy, Luc-Arthur Vebobe 14, Dounia Issa.
FOREIGN STARS (Jean-Denys Choulet): Ben Woodside, Bernard King 10, Sammy Mejia, Tremmell Darden, Chris Massie 10, Marquez Haynes, Demetric Bennett 13, K. C. Rivers 10, Davon Jefferson 21, Akin Akingbala 10.

26th All-Star Game 2011–12
Paris-Bercy, Paris, att: 14,590, December 29, 2011: French Stars - Foreign Stars 130–123  
FRENCH STARS (Christian Monschau): Amara Sy 23, Charles Lombahe-Kahudi 15, Fabien Causeur 11, Yannick Bokolo 4, Paccelis Morlende 2, Evan Fournier 14, Nicholas Pope 7, Victor Samnick 14, Ludovic Vaty 8, Adrien Moerman 22, Andrew Albicy 10, Kim Tillie.
FOREIGN STARS (Jean-Luc Monschau): Eric Chatfield 6, Akin Akingbala 12, Teddy Gipson 5, Alade Aminu 15, Cedrick Banks 8, Taylor Rochestie 11, Blake Schilb 12, Andre Barrett 8, John Holland 10, John Linehan 2, Jawad Williams 13, Lamont Hamilton 21.

27th All-Star Game 2012–13
Paris-Bercy, Paris, att: 14,570, December 30, 2012: Foreign Stars - French Stars 111–107  
FRENCH STARS (Gregor Beugnot, Alain Weisz: Antoine Diot, Edwin Jackson 13, Amara Sy 14, Ilian Evtimov, Alexis Ajinça 13, Marc-Antoine Pellin, Steed Tchicamboud, Pape-Philippe Amagou, Nobel Boungou Colo, Charles Kahudi, Ludovic Vaty 17, Rudy Gobert.
FOREIGN STARS ((JD Jackson, Claude Bergeaud): Dwight Buycks 17, Bernard King 14, Blake Schilb 13, Jawad Williams 13, Sean May, Khalid El-Amin 13, Souleymane Diabate, Kyle McAlarney, Marcus Goree, Darryl Monroe, Ahmad Nivins.

28th All-Star Game 2013–14
Zénith Arena, Paris, December 29, 2013: French Stars - Foreign Stars 130–117  
FRENCH STARS (Jean-Marc Dupraz, Nikola Antić): Andrew Albicy, Edwin Jackson, Nobel Boungou Colo 28, Florent Piétrus, Johan Passave-Ducteil 22, Antoine Diot, David Denave, Charles Lombahe-Kahudi, Jérémy Leloup, Adrien Moerman, Mouhammadou Jaiteh, Amara Sy*.
FOREIGN STARS (Philippe Hervé, Germain Castano) : Taurean Green, A. J. Slaughter, Austin Nichols, J.K. Edwards, Randal Falker, Trenton Meacham, Kyle McAlarney, David Lighty, Anthony Dobbins, Brian Greene, Lamayn Wilson, Ahmad Nivins 28.*Amara Sy did not play due to injury

29th All-Star Game 2014–15
AccorHotels Arena, Paris, January 3, 2015: French Stars - Foreign Stars 137–135 aet 121–121  
FRENCH STARS (Vincent Collet, Frédéric Brouillaud): Charles Lombahe-Kahudi 9, Antoine Diot 8, Leo Westermann, Pape Sy 8, Johan Passave-Ducteil 10, Mouhammadou Jaiteh 24, Nobel Boungou Colo, Adrien Moerman 40, Florent Pietrus, Andrew Albicy 3, Rodrigue Beaubois*, Alain Koffi 9.
FOREIGN STARS (Jean-Marc Dupraz, Savo Vučević: Sharrod Ford 18, Mark Payne 11, Jamar Smith 19, Kenny Boynton 4, Mykal Riley 15, Erving Walker 14, Zachery Peacock 7, Marcus Dove 6, Daequan Cook 13, Steven Gray 11, Kyle Weems 17, Darius Adams**.*Rodrigue Beaubois did not play due to injury.**Darius Adams replaced injured Ricardo Greer.

30th All-Star Game 2015–16
AccorHotels Arena, Paris, att: 15,000, December 30, 2015: French Stars - Foreign Stars 146–119 
FRENCH STARS (JD Jackson, Christophe Denis): Rodrigue Beaubois, Mickaël Gelabale, Charles Lombahe-Kahudi, Mouhammadou Jaiteh, Ali Traoré, Andrew Albicy 12, Antoine Eito, Billy Yakuba Ouattara, Nobel Boungou Colo 22, Ilian Evtimov, Wilfried Yeguete, Louis Labeyrie 34.
FOREIGN STARS (Zvezdan Mitrović, Laurent Pluvy): Heiko Schaffartzik, Willie Solomon 22, Mykal Riley 18, David Andersen, Marcus Dove, Michael Thompson, Chris Jones, Jeremy Hazell, Ángel Daniel Vassallo, Drew Gordon, Tim Blue, Darryl Watkins.

30th All-Star Game 2016–17
AccorHotels Arena, Paris, att: 15,000, December 29, 2016: Foreign Stars - French Stars 130–129  
FOREIGN STARS (Jean-Denys Choulet, Rémi Giuitta): D.J. Cooper, Serhiy Hladyr, Spencer Butterfield, Tim Blue 21, Darryl Watkins, Cameron Clark 18, Dario Hunt, Jakim Donaldson, Jason Rich, John Robertson 17, Mark Payne, Walter Hodge.
FRENCH STARS (Zvezdan Mitrović, Cédric Heitz): Axel Julien, Paul Lacombe, William Howard, Wilfried Yeguete 21, Moustapha Fall, Alain Koffi, Édouard Choquet, Jérémy Nzeulie, Nicolas Lang 19, David Michineau, Vincent Poirier 19, Ousmane Camara.

30th All-Star Game 2017–18
AccorHotels Arena, Paris, att: 15,000, December 29, 2017: French Stars - Foreign Stars 181–175 aet 164–164 
FOREIGN STARS (Zvezdan Mitrović, Germain Castano): John Roberson, Gerald Robinson, David Logan, Zachery Peacock, Miro Bilan, Zack Wright, Kenny Hayes, Klemen Prepelič, Trae Golden, Raymond Cowels, D.J. Stephens, Elmedin Kikanović.
FRENCH STARS (Éric Bartecheky, Laurent Pluvy): Élie Okobo, Paul Lacombe, William Howard, Amara Sy 20, Louis Labeyrie 35, Benjamin Sene, Jérémy Nzeulie, Charles Lombahe-Kahudi, Alain Koffi, Amine Noua, Youssoupha Fall, Boris Diaw**Axel Bouteille was injured and replaced by Boris Diaw.

31st All-Star Game 2018–19
AccorHotels Arena, Paris, att: 15,988, December 29, 2018: French Stars - Foreign Stars 153–147  
FOREIGN STARS (Laurent Legname, Germain Castano): Justin Robinson 21, David Lighty, Julian Wright, Devin Ebanks, Youssou Ndoye, Donta Smith, Karvel Anderson, David Holston, Vitalis Chikoko, Roko Ukic, Mardy Collins, Mouphtaou Yarou 22.
FRENCH STARS (Zvezdan Mitrović, Laurent Pluvy): Yakuba Ouattara, Paul Lacombe, Lahaou Konaté 33, Amine Noua 21, Youssoupha Fall 22, Théo Maledon, Nicolas De Jong, Antoine Eito, Jeremy Leloup*, Alain Koffi, Ali Traoré, Benoît Mangin.*Charles Lombahe-Kahudi was injured and replaced by Jeremy Leloup.

32nd All-Star Game 2019–20
AccorHotels Arena, Paris, att: 15,000, December 29, 2019: Foreign Stars - French Stars 129–119 
FRENCH STARS (Zvezdan Mitrović, Stéphane Eberlin): Antoine Diot, Edwin Jackson, Isaïa Cordinier, Damien Inglis 29, Yannis Morin, Antoine Eito (c) 15, Axel Julian, Jean-Batiste Maille, Benoît Mangin, Alpha Kaba, Livio Jean-Charles, Abdoulaye Ndoye.
FOREIGN STARS (Frédéric Fauthoux, Rémy Valin): Dee Bost, Briante Weber, Chris Horton, David Holston, Vitalis Chikoko, Eric Buckner* 27, Norris Cole, Tonye Jekiri, Miralem Halilovic*, J. J. O'Brien, Justin Robinson, Rob Gray 21.*Zack Wright, and Semaj Christon withdrew due to injury and replaced by Miralem Halilovic and MVP Erik Buckner.

Players with most appearances

References

External links
Official site 
LNB Official site 

All-Star Game
Basketball all-star games